Bavette may refer to:

 Bavette (pasta), a type of ribbon pasta noodle, similar to spaghetti, that has a flat section and a slightly convex shape
 Flank steak
 Bib (garment), as in baby-bib [a napkin tied under the chin of a child while eating], also referred to as a "bavette"

See also
 Bavet, Svay Rieng, Cambodia